Indiana wine refers to wine made from grapes grown in the U.S. state of Indiana.  Wine has been produced in the area since the early days of European colonization in the 18th century.  In the mid-19th century, Indiana was the tenth-largest winegrape producing state in the country.

There are two American Viticultural Areas (AVA) in Indiana: the Ohio River Valley AVA which also contains portions of Kentucky and Ohio, and the Indiana Uplands AVA which is wholly located in south-central Indiana and includes the oldest and most prolific winery in Indiana, Oliver Winery.

References

 
Wine regions of the United States by state
1816 establishments in Indiana